Stan Goff (born November 12, 1951, in San Diego, California) is an American anti-war activist, writer, and blogger. Prior to his activism Goff had a long career in the U.S. armed forces, serving in the United States Army from 1970 to 1996 with two breaks in service. After retiring from the military he became a political activist, adopting anti-imperialist, feminist, and socialist/Marxist views, and is now a Christian. He is an active blogger and is the author of several books, including Hideous Dream (2000), Full-Spectrum Disorder: The Military in the New American Century (2004), Energy War (2006), Sex & War (2006), Borderline - Reflections on War, Sex, and Church (2015), "Mammon's Ecology - Metaphysic of the Empty Sign" (2018), and "Tough Gynes - Violent Women in Film as Honorary Men" (2019). He has also been a contributor to CounterPunch and Huffington Post.

Military career
Goff was sent to Vietnam in 1970-71 during the Vietnam war. He served with the 173rd Airborne Brigade as an infantryman, after which he was reassigned to the 82nd Airborne Division at Fort Bragg, North Carolina following a bout with drug-resistant malaria. In 1973, he was honorably discharged with the rank of sergeant.

During a break in service, he attended college at the University of Arkansas in Monticello and married Elizabeth Mackall. Their daughter, Elan Mackall Goff, was born September 1, 1976. In 1977, he enlisted again in the Army and was assigned to the 4th Infantry Division (Mechanized) as a Private First Class, re-earning his sergeant's stripes in 1979. That same year, he joined the 75th Ranger Regiment, and after graduation from indoc, was reassigned to the 2nd Ranger Battalion on Fort Lewis, Washington.

After two years with the 2nd Ranger Battalion, Goff earned the rank of Staff Sergeant, and reenlisted on condition of reassignment to the Jungle Operations Training Center in Panama working as a small unit tactics instructor. He volunteered for the 1st Special Forces Operational Detachment-Delta (SFOD-D) during that assignment. After unit selection and training, Goff participated in operations in Guatemala, El Salvador, and Grenada (see Operation Urgent Fury).

In December, 1986, Goff was relieved from Delta with the rank of Sergeant First Class, based on an accusation that he denies related to having taken a woman into the Ambassador to El Salvador's residence for sex. He admits, however, that during the time of the alleged encounter, he was walking around the block with a local prostitute to smoke marijuana with her.

He was reassigned to the staff and faculty at the United States Military Academy at West Point. He served as the NCOIC of the Service Orientation Course, and developed the Ranger Orientation Program that selected cadets to attend Ranger School during their Junior-Senior summer. He permitted his enlistment to expire in 1987 - working for a time training SWAT teams for the Department of Energy Y-12 nuclear weapon facility in Oak Ridge, Tennessee.

He rejoined the US Army in 1988, as a Staff Sergeant, and was assigned to the 1st Ranger Battalion.

Goff then volunteered for Special Forces training in 1989, and became a Special Operations Medical Sergeant assigned to the 7th Special Forces Group at Fort Bragg. While with 7th Group, he performed training and operational missions in Central and South America. Many of these missions were presented officially to the public as "counter-narcotics" operations supporting the War on Drugs. Goff later wrote that this dissonance was formative in his political shift to the left. 

In 1990, he was divorced from Elizabeth Mackall. He was remarried in 1992 to Sherry Long in Fayetteville, North Carolina. He has three step-children from the marriage: Jessie Hobbs, Jayme Hobbs and Jeremy Hobbs.

Goff was reassigned to the 75th Ranger Regiment as a Special Operations Medical Sergeant in 1993, and was attached to 3rd Ranger Battalion as part of Task Force Ranger for the operation in Mogadishu, Somalia. Goff was redeployed to Fort Benning before the infamous Bakara firefight after a dispute with a Ranger captain that verged upon violence. Not long after, he was promoted to Master Sergeant, effectively changing his job description from Special Forces Medic to SF Operations Sergeant.

Goff was then reassigned back to Fort Bragg, to the 3rd Special Forces Group, where he was given the task of running a Special Forces team, called an A-Detachment (in this case, Operational Detachment - A (ODA) 354, a military free-fall parachute specialty team). The story of his time with this team, up to and including his retirement from the Army in February 1996 (with special emphasis on Operation Restore Democracy in Haiti in 1994) is recounted in detail in his first book, Hideous Dream - A Soldier's Memoir of the US Invasion of Haiti (Soft Skull Press, 2000).

Activism
Goff became politically active almost immediately after his military career ended, and quickly took up the study of Marxism.  He joined the Communist Party USA for a brief period, but left the party in response to what he describes as the demand for "ideological conformity," and his belief that the party was hostile to feminism. This is a criticism he levels frequently at the entire left, which he describes as "male-dominated, and tokenizing of women.".

In 1996, Goff secured a job as organizing director for Democracy South, a non-profit organization which did research and advocacy on money-and-politics in the South, and stayed there for the next five and a half years.

In 2001, he did a short stint as the military technical adviser for the Arnold Schwarzenegger action film Collateral Damage, which he describes as one of the most miserable jobs in his life, and for which he publicly apologized after the film was altered, in the wake of 9-11, into what Goff called "yet another male revenge fantasy".

Throughout this post-military period, he remained in touch with Haitian political issues, and developed a close working relationship with Katharine Kean, a film maker who has worked in Haiti for decades, and the political cadres of the National Popular Party, a left party in Haiti with a peasant popular base.  He returned to Haiti dozens of times since then, and has written extensively on the political developments there.

After the September 11 attacks and the resulting push for war, Goff was in demand as a public speaker. His military career and his opposition to the coming war gave him a degree of immunity from many criticisms made against anti-war advocates.

He also became involved with the Freedom Road Socialist Organization around the same time, drawn primarily by the organization's analysis of Black nationalism, and the organization's stated goal of the "refoundation" of the American Left.  In the process of writing a column called "Military Matters" for the organization, he began his second book, Full Spectrum Disorder - The Military in the New American Century, (Soft Skull Press, 2004).

Activism against the Iraq War
Goff is referred to in Mary Tillman's book, Boots on the Ground by Dusk” as being a major influence and assistance in getting to the truth behind the death of former NFL player Pat Tillman.

After the publication of Full Spectrum Disorder, Goff became interested in the connections between militarism and the social construction of masculinity.  He studied feminist writings and theory over the next two years in the process of writing his third book, Sex & War (Lulu Press, 2006).

In March 2006 Goff helped to organize the Veterans and Survivors March of the Iraq Veterans Against the War, Veterans For Peace, Military Families Speak Out, and Gold Star Families for Peace to call attention to the cost of the war in Iraq and its impact on relief efforts along the Gulf coast after Hurricanes Katrina and Rita.

After the Veterans and Survivors March, Goff pulled back from public engagement and worked as a landscape helper, an apprentice stonemason, and a home deconstruction crew with Wake County (NC) Habitat for Humanity.

He took up a study of the historical Jesus in 2006, and from that study gained an interest in theology. In 2008, he was baptized and is a professed Christian and pacifist, eschewing political labels like socialist or anarchist.  In 2009, he wrote a tract entitled "Why I won't call myself progressive", that reflected the influences of Christian writers John Howard Yoder, Stanley Hauerwas, Amy Laura Hall, and Ivan Illich.  He is an advocate of non-coercive, community re-localization efforts and what he calls "food praxis," or practical activities that promote food sovereignty.

Goff resided with his wife, Sherry, for a year - 2009-2010 - in Grecia, Costa Rica; and now lives in Michigan.  He worked with the Adrian Dominican Sisters on a long term permaculture land use project until 2017, and now devotes full time to writing.

Books by Goff
 (2000) Hideous Dream. Soft Skull Press. 
 (2004) Full-Spectrum Disorder. CreateSpace Publishing. 
 (2006) Energy War - Exterminism. Publisher: Stan Goff (Std Copyright). ASIN B002EVQC8C
 (2006) Sex & War. Lulu Press Publishers. 
 (2015) Borderline - Reflections on War, Sex, and Church. Cascade Books Publishers. 
 (2018) Mammon's Ecology - Metaphysic of the Empty Sign. Cascade Books 
 (2019) "Tough Gynes - Violent Women in Film as Honorary Men". Cascade Books

Filmography
Hijacking Catastrophe (2004), interviewee
Leave No Soldier (2008), interviewee
The Tillman Story (2010), interviewee

References

External links

Stan Goff Blog: Chasin' Jesus 
2015 Interview With Stan Goff

1951 births
Living people
American anti–Iraq War activists
American bloggers
American Christian pacifists
American Christian socialists
American feminist writers
United States Army soldiers
United States Army personnel of the Vietnam War
Members of the United States Army Special Forces
American socialist feminists
Male feminists
Proponents of Christian feminism